Conneff Park is a GAA stadium in Clane, County Kildare, Ireland.  It is the home of Clane GAA and one of the main grounds of Kildare's hurling team. The ground is named after Tommy Conneff, an Irish athlete.

References

Gaelic games grounds in the Republic of Ireland
Kildare GAA
Sports venues in County Kildare